Izabela Wagner-Saffray (born November 3, 1964) is a Polish born European sociologist. Wagner has been an Associate Professor at the Institute of Sociology at Collegium Civitas in Warsaw since December 2019. She is also a Fellow at ICM (Institut Convergence Migration) in Paris since 2019. Her sociological research is concerned with violin virtuosos. Wagner's contributions are focused on the careers of artists and intellectuals, professional socialization and geographic mobility, migrations and forced-migrations.

Early life and education
Wagner was born on November 3, 1964, in Wołów, Poland, in a family of musicians.

Scientific work
Wagner worked at the musical academia as a Jaques-Dalcroze method specialist, as Assistant Professor at the University of Music in Poznań, Poland in 1986-87 and at Conservatory of Music in Nanterre, France in 1988 - 2001. Later since 2008 she worked at the Institute of Sociology - University of Warsaw.

Wagner has been an Associate Professor at the Institute of Sociology at Collegium Civitas in Warsaw since December 2019. She is also a Fellow at ICM (Institut Convergence Migration) in Paris since 2019.

Within the field of sociological research, Wagner's contributions are focused on the careers of artists and intellectuals, professional socialization and geographic mobility, migrations and forced-migrations. Linking history with sociology she wrote about antisemitism in Europe in 20th and 21st centuries.

Wagner did sociological research mainly in Europe but also in the US and China. She was a visiting scholar at Harvard (2010/2011) and the New School for Social Research in New York City (2016). Wagner's monographs have appeared in Chinese, English, Polish, Portuguese, and Russian.

Wagner's research activity addresses Musicology, Ethnomusicology, Composition, Music Education, Global Jazz Studies, Music Industry, Music Performance, and Music Performance Studies.

Publications
Becoming Transnational Professional: Kariery I Mobilność Polskich Elit Naukowych [Careers and mobility of Polish scientific elites] (in Polish, Wydawnictwo Naukowe Scholar, 2011): the introduction recounts how Wagner has immersed herself in the world of scientists, labs, experiments. She considers the correlation between the scientist's symptoms of talent at an early age and their success as adults.
Producing Excellence: The Making of Virtuosos (Rutgers Press, 2015) (Wiley, 2020): Wagner spent many years in close contact with several musical prodigies, producing this long-lasting ethnographical study. The monograph was featured among the top ten in China.
Bauman: A Biography (Polity Press, 2020): Zygmunt Bauman and Wagner shared a Polish background but represent different sociological schools.

References

External links
Home page

1964 births
People from Wołów
Living people
Polish sociologists
Polish women sociologists
School for Advanced Studies in the Social Sciences alumni
Academic staff of the University of Warsaw